Troy is a city in Oakland County, Michigan, United States. Its population was 87,294 at the 2020 U.S. census, making Troy the most populous city in the county and the 13th most-populous municipality in the state.
 
Troy was organized as a township in 1827, and sections of the township incorporated much later into the cities of Birmingham, Clawson, and Royal Oak. The remainder of the township incorporated as the present-day city of Troy in 1955.

Troy has become a business and shopping destination in the region, with numerous office centers and the upscale Somerset Collection mall. In 2011, Troy was ranked the safest city in Michigan and the 19th safest city in the United States. In 2008, Troy was ranked 22nd on a list of "Best Places to Live" in the United States by CNN Money, using criteria including housing, quality of education, economic strength, and recreational opportunities. In 2008, Troy was also ranked as the fourth most-affordable U.S. city with a median household income of approximately $79,000.

History
The earliest recorded purchases of land in what was known as Troy Township occurred in 1819. A couple of years later a settlement known as Troy Corners was established due to Johnson Niles buying 160 acres in the region. The area is currently the north-central area of Troy. In 1827 Troy Township was established. In 1955, Troy was officially incorporated primarily as a strategy for preventing border cities from taking more land.

It was named after Troy, New York and the ancient city of Troy, as many of the early settlers, as in much of Michigan, originated from New York.

Culture
The Troy Historic Village is a fully interactive historical museum chronicling the different stages of Troy's progression from its first settlers to the city it has become today. Located at the corners of Livernois Road and Wattles Road, the village is located behind the old city hall building. Open year-round, the village has ten original, complete structures which patrons may enter and observe how they functioned in the past and how they were decorated, as all buildings are full of artifacts from that period. Each structure is original and was painstakingly moved from its original location to the museum intact. Starting with a log and mud structure used by the first settlers, there is also an 18th-century schoolhouse and estate, a general store, a blacksmith's shop, a church along with the pastor's home, and the old city hall, which acts as a general museum. There is a gazebo in the center of the square which will host parties and period bands during annual festivities. Many schools from around the area plan field trips to the museum, and the church is also available for weddings.

The beaver is the symbol of Troy, and the city's main commercial thoroughfare (Big Beaver Road) is named after it.

Religion
Troy is home to two of the largest Protestant churches in the USA, Kensington Community Church and Woodside Bible Church.

The Greek Orthodox Archdiocese of America Metropolis of Detroit is headquartered in Troy.

Sports
In 2003, Troy was named Michigan's Sportstown by Sports Illustrated magazine for having the top community sports programs in the state.

Media
In addition to The Detroit News and Detroit Free Press, regional newspapers serving all of southeast Michigan, the city is served by the Daily Tribune (published daily), the Observer & Eccentric (which is published twice a week), the Troy Beacon (published every Thursday), the Troy Times, and the Troy-Somerset Gazette and, most recently, Troy Patch. The Troy Eccentric newspaper edition ceased publication in 2009.

Parks 
City of Troy Parks include a variety of amenities and a mixture of open space, woodlands, rivers, lakes and recreational facilities. You will find soccer fields, ball diamonds, disc golf courses, shore fishing, outdoor exercise equipment, tennis courts, basketball courts, natural and paved walking pathways, play structures and swing sets, a skate park, picnic areas and pavilions.

List of Neighborhood Parks:

 Beach Road Park
 Beaver Trail Park
 Brinston Park
 Phillip J. Huber Park
 Milverton Park
 North Glen Park
 Redwood Park
 Robinwood Park
 Schroeder Park
 Sylan Geln Lake Park

List of Community Parks:

 Boulan Park
 Firefighters Park
 Donald J. Flynn Park
 Jaycee Park
 Raintree Park
 Troy Skate Park

Restaurants 
Troy has a vibrant restaurant scene many of which are located on 16 Mile Road - Big Beaver Road.

Geography

Climate

Economy

 
Troy is a thriving center of business, particularly in the automotive and financial sectors, and is home to a number of major companies. Troy has the second highest cumulative property value in Michigan, second only to Detroit. Troy is home to the Somerset Collection mall, featuring a skywalk and over 180 stores, and the Oakland Mall. The Top of Troy is the city's tallest building with offices of PNC Financial Services. Bank of America maintains a major operations center in Troy.

In 2012 Mahindra & Mahindra opened a technical center in Troy.

Major companies

 Altair Engineering
 Anchor Bay Entertainment
 Bank of America (major center)
 Behr America
Canadian National Railway (Traded as Grand Trunk Western)
 Champion Homes
 CredentialCheck
 Dayco
 Delphi
 DuPont Automotive
 Entertainment Publications
 Flagstar Bank
 iCONMA LLC
 Inteva Products
 J. D. Power and Associates
 Kelly Services
 The Kresge Foundation
 Magna Powertrain
 Mahindra & Mahindra
 Meritor
 Molina Healthcare
 North American Bancard
 Olga's Kitchen
 Plastic Omnium
 Plex Systems
 Rexair
 RHK Technology, Inc.
 Saleen Special Vehicles
 SAE International
 Sonic Alert
 Specter Werkes/Sports
 SRG Global
 STANLEY Black and Decker
 Syntel
 Tata Consultancy Services (TCS)
 ThyssenKrupp USA
 Tyler Technologies
 ViSalus
 The Woodbridge Company (US Headquarters)
 Ziebart
 HTC Global Services

Companies formerly based or located in Troy
 Arbor Drugs was headquartered in Troy until it was acquired by CVS Corporation in 1998 for an estimated $1.48 billion, in the process making CVS the largest chain-drug retailer in the Detroit market.
 Frank's Nursery & Crafts was an arts and crafts chain spanning 14 states that was headquartered in Troy, even after being acquired by General Host Corporation in 1983. The company filed for bankruptcy in 2004, and became defunct soon after.
 Kmart was headquartered in Troy until it acquired Sears in 2005, establishing itself in the former Sears headquarters in Hoffman Estates, Illinois. Its former headquarters building still remains at 3100 W. Big Beaver Road, though it has been scheduled for demolition, and the creation of a landscaped square with boulevards lined with upscale shops, restaurants, offices, a theater, and condominiums; those plans collapsed in the recession.
 Genicom had a manufacturing and repairs plant, in the 1980s.

Demographics

According to a 2018 estimate, the median income for a household in the city was $96,864, and the median income for a family was $113,640. Males had a median income of $72,005 versus $52,365 for females. The per capita income for the city was $46,664. About 5.1% of families and 7.2% of the population were below the poverty line, including 6.7% of those under age 18 and 6.1% of those age 65 or over.

2020 census 
As of the census of 2020, there were 87,294 people, 33,822 households, and 24,300 families living in the city. The racial makeup of the city was 62.2% White, 4.0% African American, 0% Native American, 27.3% Asian, 1.2% from other races, and 5.1% from two or more races. Hispanic or Latino of any race were 2.2% of the population.

There were 33,822 households, of which 35.4% had children under the age of 18 living with them, 60.1% were married couples living together, 8.3% had a female householder with no husband present, 3.4% had a male householder with no wife present, and 28.2% were non-families. 23.2% of all households were made up of individuals, and 10.1% had someone living alone who was 65 years of age or older. The average household size was 2.56 and the average family size was 3.05.

The median age in the city was 43.9 years. 20.7% of residents were under the age of 18; 8.8% were between the ages of 18 and 24; 32% were from 25 to 44; 28.6% were from 45 to 64; and 19.7% were 65 years of age or older. The gender makeup of the city was 50.5% male and 49.5% female.

2010 census
As of the census of 2010, there were 80,980 people, 30,703 households, and 22,443 families living in the city. The racial makeup of the city was 74.1% White, 4.0% African American, 0.2% Native American, 19.1% Asian, 0.6% from other races, and 2.0% from two or more races. Hispanic or Latino of any race were 2.1% of the population.

There were 30,703 households, of which 34.7% had children under the age of 18 living with them, 62.8% were married couples living together, 7.3% had a female householder with no husband present, 3.0% had a male householder with no wife present, and 26.9% were non-families. 23.4% of all households were made up of individuals, and 9.6% had someone living alone who was 65 years of age or older. The average household size was 2.63 and the average family size was 3.14.

The median age in the city was 41.8 years. 23.8% of residents were under the age of 18; 6.7% were between the ages of 18 and 24; 24% were from 25 to 44; 31.6% were from 45 to 64; and 13.8% were 65 years of age or older. The gender makeup of the city was 49.3% male and 50.7% female.

2000 census
From the census of 2000, there were 80,959 people, 30,018 households, and 21,883 families living in the city. The racial makeup of the city was 82.30% White, 2.09% African American, 0.15% Native American, 13.25% Asian, 0.02% Pacific Islander, 0.36% from other races, and 1.82% from two or more races. 1.46% of the population was Hispanic or Latino of any race.

There were 30,018 households, out of which 36.9% had children under the age of 18 living with them, 64.5% were married couples living together, 6.0% had a female householder with no husband present, and 27.1% were non-families. 22.8% of all households were made up of individuals, and 7.8% had someone living alone who was 65 years of age or older. The average household size was 2.69 and the average family size was 3.23.

In the city 26.2% of the population was under the age of 18, 6.7% from 18 to 24, 29.8% from 25 to 44, 27.1% from 45 to 64, and 10.2% who were 65 years of age or older. The median age was 38 years. For every 100 females, there were 98.1 males. For every 100 females age 18 and over, there were 94.8 males.

From 1990 to 2000, of all of the municipalities in Oakland, Wayne, and Macomb counties, Troy had the highest numeric growth in the Asian population. It had 4,932 Asians according to the 1990 U.S. Census and 10,730 according to the 2000 U.S. Census, an increase of 5,798. The increase gave Troy the largest Asian-American population in the tri-county area, surpassing that of Detroit.

Government
Troy uses the Council-Manager form of government, and thus is governed by a City Council consisting of a Mayor and six council members. The current mayor is Ethan Baker, who was elected to a four-year term on November 5, 2019. The city council appoints a City Manager, who manages the day-to-day operations of the city.

The City of Troy and City of Clawson on its southern border compose Michigan's 41st District for State Representative. The district is currently represented by Padma Kuppa in the State House since 2019, and in the state Senate by Mallory McMorrow, since 2019. The district was previously represented in the State House by Martin Howrylak since 2013, and in the state Senate by Marty Knollenberg, since 2015. On the national level, Troy was part of the 9th district, represented by Joe Knollenberg from 1993 to 2009 and Gary Peters, who defeated Knollenberg in a highly publicized race in November 2008. Nationally, Troy is part of the 11th district, held by Democrat Haley Stevens.

In May 2010, the Troy city council voted to adopt a budget that called for the Troy Public Library to close on July 1, 2011.  A proposal was made to increase property taxes in order for the library to run independently, but the citizens voted it down by a 2.2 percent margin. A Library millage was ultimately passed in 2011 that exists today.

Education

Colleges and universities
Troy is home to Walsh College, a business-oriented school, as well as branches for the University of Phoenix, Northwood University, Central Michigan University, Spring Arbor University, and the International Academy of Design and Technology. Michigan State University also has its Management Education Center (Eli Broad College of Business) located off of I-75 near the intersection of Crooks Rd. and Square Lake Rd. (19 Mile).

Primary and secondary schools
There are 7 different school districts serving the city of Troy; however, Troy School District serves the majority of the limits. The district has multiple elementary schools, four middle schools, and two zoned high schools: Troy High School and Athens High School.

There are also three school districts that have sizable portions of territory in Troy and that operate at least one elementary school within the city; these are Avondale School District, in the north and northwest most portion of the city, Birmingham City School District, in the southwest most portion, and Warren Consolidated Schools, in the southeast, which operates Susick Elementary within the city. These districts operate Woodland Elementary, Pembroke Elementary, and Susick Elementary, respectively.

In addition, there are two other school districts within the city that have residential territory there, those being Bloomfield Hills School District, with a portion of the northwest part of the city, and Royal Oak School District, which has a very small portion of the southern part of the city. Finally, a small area of commercial property also in the south lies within the borders of Lamphere Public Schools

The Troy School District also hosts the eastern campus of the International Academy, currently ranked 7th in the Newsweek rankings of the best public high schools in the United States. The school has been located in the older Baker Middle School building since the beginning of the 2008–2009 academic year. Previously, Troy sent students through the class of 2011 to the central IA campus in Bloomfield Hills.

Private schools:
 Bethany Christian School
 Brookfield Academy
Oakland Children's Academy
St. Mark Christian Academy
Troy Adventist Academy

Transportation

Oakland-Troy Airport
Oakland-Troy Airport (FAA LID: VLL, ICAO: KVLL), formerly (IATA: 7D2, ICAO: K7D2) is a small suburban general aviation airport operated by Oakland County and has a single  paved runway.

The Oakland-Troy Airport is considered the county's 'executive' airport. Business travelers and tourists using private, corporate and charter aircraft benefit from the airport's convenient proximity to business, recreation and entertainment facilities. It is located between Maple Road and 14 Mile Road.

Charter passenger, air freight, as well as aircraft maintenance and fuel, are available on the field.

Troy was also home to the Big Beaver Airport, (IATA: 3BB), which was located at the corners of Big Beaver Road and John R Road. It opened in 1946 and closed in 1995 due to declining use and pressure to sell the land for commercial development.

Roads and freeways

 cuts through the middle of Troy from the north-west corner bordering Bloomfield Township, and continuing southward towards the south-east border of the city entering Madison Heights. Exit numbers 65, 67, 69, and 72 directly service Troy.

M-1/Woodward Avenue and US-24/Telegraph Road are on the west side of Troy and provide access to the city.

Mile Roads

 14 Mile Road (southernmost border with Madison Heights)
 15 Mile Road - Maple Road
 16 Mile Road - Big Beaver Road
 17 Mile Road - Wattles Road
 18 Mile Road - Long Lake Road
 19 Mile Road - Square Lake Road
 20 Mile Road - South Boulevard (northernmost border with Rochester Hills)

Notable people
Ken Appledorn, actor
 Jon Berti, professional baseball player for the Miami Marlins, born in Troy
 Chan-Jin Chung, Professor and Founder of Robofest
 Chuck Collins, philanthropist and author
 Sean Collins, NHL defenseman for the Washington Capitals
 Rick Ferrell, Hall of Fame baseball player, lived in Troy
 Hunter Foster, Tony Award-nominated Broadway actor/singer
 Sutton Foster, Tony Award-winning actress, singer and dancer
 Kenny Goins, basketball player for Atomerőmű SE, formerly played for Michigan State
 Ellen Hollman, film and television actress
 Robert J. Huber, mayor of Troy from 1959 to 1964, state senator and congressman
 Martin Klebba, actor, known from the Pirates of the Caribbean films and Scrubs
 Steve McCatty, former MLB pitcher and coach
 Ivana Miličević, television and film actress
 Tomo Miličević, guitarist, Thirty Seconds to Mars
 Bridget Regan, musician, Flogging Molly
 Rucka Rucka Ali, Rapper best known for black comedy style parody songs on YouTube
 Israa Seblani, Lebanese doctor and survivor of the 2020 Beirut explosion
 Hugh W. Sloan Jr., Watergate figure
 Carolyn Warmus, high-profile killer
 We Came as Romans, rock band
 Steven Yeun, Academy Award-nominated actor, known for his role in The Walking Dead

See also

Oakland County, Michigan
Birmingham, Michigan
Bloomfield Hills, Michigan
Rochester Hills, Michigan
Sterling Heights, Michigan
Athens High School (Troy, Michigan)
Troy High School (Michigan)

References

Troy residents call to keep politics out of Aug. 2 library vote

External links

 Official website

 
Cities in Oakland County, Michigan
Metro Detroit
1955 establishments in Michigan
Populated places established in 1955